The 2014 Alon Shvut stabbing attack occurred on 10 November 2014, when Palestinian Maher al-Hashlamun first attempted to run his vehicle into a crowd waiting at the bus/hitch-hiking station at the entrance to the Israeli settlement of Alon Shvut, in the Gush Etzion section of the occupied West Bank, then, when the car was stopped by a bollard, got out and attacked with a knife, killing a young woman and wounding two others. The attack occurred four hours after the killing of Sergeant Almog Shiloni in Tel Aviv and took place at the same bus/hitch-hiking stop where three Israeli teenagers were kidnapped and murdered in June 2014.

Attack
The attacker, Maher al-Hashlamun, first attempted to ram his vehicle into the crowd at the bus stop, ramming his car into the bus shelter and bollards and only abandoning it to attack the crowd with a knife when he found the way blocked by concrete bollards.

Al-Hashlamun was shot in the chest by a security guard, and was taken to Hadassah Medical Center in Ein Kerem. He later died from his wounds.

Victims
Dalia Lemkus, 26, a resident of Tekoa, was seriously wounded but attempts to resuscitate her failed and she was pronounced dead at the scene. She had recently finished her university degree in occupational therapy. Lemkus had been a victim of violence before.

In a February 2006 attack that The Jewish Press described as "eerily similar", Lemkus was stabbed while waiting at a hitchhiking station at the Gush Etzion Junction. She had continued taking rides at the official hitching posts which are built in areas where public transit is scarce, regarding it as an act of defiance against terrorism. She had been known to say, “You think I’m going to let them beat me?" She was buried in Tekoa.

A man in his mid-20s was stabbed in the stomach, suffering light-to-moderate wounds, and was taken to the Hadassah Medical Center in Jerusalem's Ein Kerem. A second man in his 50s was lightly wounded, suffering from stab wounds to the jaw, and was taken to the Shaare Zedek Medical Center, also in Jerusalem.

Perpetrator

The assailant, resident of Hebron, is a member of Islamic Jihad. He was jailed in Israel from 2000-2005 after he was convicted of throwing Molotov cocktails at an IDF patrol.

Perpetrator was sentenced to serve 2 life sentences.

Political context
According to CNN, the attack comes "amid a new round of infighting between Palestinian factions". Daniel Nisman told The Wall Street Journal the attacks were not centrally coordinated, but, rather, inspired by weeks of social media propaganda by Palestinian groups praising recent individuals who attacked Israelis and calling on Palestinians to replicate those attacks. According to Nisman, these are often copycat attacks, replicating recent incidents, but "They're not ordered. They spontaneous."

Impact

Prime Minister Netanyahu immediately convened the security cabinet, ordering some troops to switch from training maneuvers to active duty protecting roads from rioters and terrorists.

See also
 2014 Jerusalem tractor attack
 October 2014 Jerusalem vehicular attack
 November 2014 Jerusalem vehicular attack
 Assassination attempt of Yehuda Glick
 Silent Intifada
 2011 Tel Aviv nightclub attack, another combined car ramming and stabbing attack
 Ohio State University attack, another combined car ramming and stabbing attack

References

 

Terrorist attacks attributed to Palestinian militant groups
Terrorist incidents involving vehicular attacks
Terrorist incidents involving knife attacks
Attacks in Asia in 2014
Terrorist incidents in the West Bank in 2014
Stabbing attacks in 2014
November 2014 crimes in Asia
Vehicular rampage in Israel
Stabbing attacks in Israel
2014 murders in Asia